This is a list of Punjabi cinema actresses.

 Aditi Sharma
 Amar Noorie
 Asha Saini
 Avantika Hundal
 Bhanu Sri Mehra
 Bharti Singh
 Bhavana Bhatt
 Bhumika Chawla
 Dhriti Saharan
 Diljott
 Divya Dutta
 Dolly Ahluwalia
 Dolly Minhas
 Farah
 Gracy Singh
 Gul Panag
 Gurleen Chopra
 Himanshi Khurana
 Indira
Ihana Dhillon
 Japji Khaira
 Jaspinder Cheema
 Juhi Chawla
 Kainaat Arora
 Khushboo Grewal
 Kirandeep Verma
 Kriti Sanon
 Kul Sidhu
 Kulraj Randhawa
 Lauren Gottlieb
 Madalsa Sharma
 Madhuri Bhattacharya
 Mahi Gill
 Mandy Takhar
 Manjeet Kullar
 Meher Vij
 Monica Gill
 Neelam Sivia
 Navneet Kaur Dhillon
 Neena Cheema
 Neeru Bajwa
 Neetu Singh
Neha Sharma
 Niharika Kareer
 Nirmal Rishi
 Nishi (actress)
 Noor Jehan
 Nimrat Khaira
 Padma Khanna
 Parul Gulati
 Pooja Verma
 Prabhjeet Kaur
 Prabhleen Sandhu
 Priti Sapru
 Priya Gill
 Radha Saluja
 Raj Shoker
 Rajeshwari Sachdev
 Rama Vij
 Roopi Gill
 Ritu Shivpuri
 Sakshi Gulati
 Sameksha
Sapna Pabbi
 Sargun Mehta
 Shiwani Saini
 Shruti Sodhi
 Simi Chahal
 Simran Kaur Mundi
 Smita Patil
 Shehnaaz Gill
 Sonam Bajwa
 Surbhi Jyoti
 Surilie Gautam
 Surveen Chawla
 Swati Kapoor
 Tania
 Teejay Sidhu
 Tulip Joshi
 Upasana Singh
 Vidushi Behl
 Vimi
 Wamiqa Gabbi
 Zareen Khan

See also 
List of Punjabi cinema actors

Cinema of Punjab
+